Benvid or Benavid, also known as Benoyd or Bambiz, may refer to:
 Benvid-e Olya
 Benvid-e Sofla